Secretly Still and Quiet is a 1953 West German musical comedy film directed by Hans Deppe and starring Gretl Schörg, Hans Nielsen, and Theo Lingen. It was made at the Munich Studios of Bavaria Film. The film's sets were designed by the art director Erich Kettelhut.

Cast

References

Bibliography

External links 
 

1953 films
1953 musical comedy films
German musical comedy films
West German films
1950s German-language films
Films directed by Hans Deppe
Bavaria Film films
German black-and-white films
1950s German films
Films shot at Bavaria Studios